One Way Ticket is a 1997 Australian made-for-television drama film directed by Richard Franklin. The film was inspired by real events in the life of prison officer Heather Parker, who assisted in the escape of Peter Gibb and Archie Butterly.

Plot
A criminal languishing in jail embarks on a torrid affair with a female guard. However, events take a sinister turn as she becomes increasingly besotted, and news of their romance becomes public – leading to the collapse of her marriage. Desperate, she agrees to help the crook escape, only to start doubting his commitment.

Cast
Peter Phelps as Mick Webb
Rachel Blakely as Deborah Carter
Chris Haywood as Bertie
Jane Hall as Kate Stark
Joseph Spano as Kaiser
Adriano Cortese as Tumeo
Russell Fletcher as Geoff
Marie-Louise Jolicoeur as Maureen
Samuel Johnson as Jimmie
Doug Bowles as Preece
Regina Gaigalas as Lena
Richard E. Young as Louis
Sally Lightfoot as Pam
Dennis Miller as Alf
Elspeth Ballantyne as Elizabeth
Richard Moir as Governor
Frank Gallacher as Macca
Troy Rowley as Mouse
Terry Gill as Buddle
Elly Varrenti as Mags

Production
Some filming took place at St. Andrews Hotel, St. Andrews, Victoria, Australia.

References

External links

1997 television films
1997 films
Australian drama television films
1997 drama films
Films directed by Richard Franklin (director)
Films scored by Nerida Tyson-Chew
Films about prison escapes
1990s English-language films
English-language drama films